May Britt Lagesen (born 18 February 1971) is a Norwegian politician for the Labour  Party. From 2021 she meets regularly at the Storting while Ingvild Kjerkol is government ministe.

Career
Lagesen was elected deputy representative to the Storting from the constituency of Nord-Trøndelag for the periods 2013–2017, 2017–2021 and 2021–2025, for the Labour  Party. She replaces Ingvild Kjerkol in the Storting from 2021 while Kjerkol is government minister.

References

1971 births
Living people
People from Steinkjer
Labour Party (Norway) politicians
Members of the Storting